Nahr-e Hamid (also Romanized as Nahr-e Ḩamīd; also known as Ālbū Ḩamīd and Ḩamīd) is a village in Nasar Rural District, Arvandkenar District, Abadan County, Khuzestan Province, Iran. At the 2006 census, its population was 194, in 47 families.

References 

Populated places in Abadan County